Ron Hosking (born 18 September 1943) is  a former Australian rules footballer who played with Geelong in the Victorian Football League (VFL).

Notes

External links 		
		
		
		
		
		
		
Living people		
1943 births		
		
Australian rules footballers from Victoria (Australia)		
Geelong Football Club players